Schwerin Hauptbahnhof is the main railway station of the capital of the German state of Mecklenburg-Vorpommern and is located in the northwest of the central city. It includes four tracks on two platforms and a siding west of the fourth track. Currently the station is used by about 12,000 passengers a day.

Building

The station building was built in 1889 and 1890 to a design by E. Müller in the style of the Gründerzeit. The main hall has two lower links connecting to corner pavilions. The entrance hall was lowered in 1927. A few shops are located in the lobby next to the service facilities of Deutsche Bahn. A pedestrian tunnel leads from the hall to two island platforms with four platform tracks. On the opposite side of the station the tunnel is connected to two staircases and an elevator. These lead to Straße Zum Bahnhof (street), which connects to the Platz der Freiheit.

At the station forecourt is a fountain called Rettung in Seenot ("rescue at sea") built in 1910 with bronze sculptures by Hugo Berwald. The fountain was located in the Markt (market) square until 1927. The station forecourt is surrounded by other public transport facilities, the InterCity Hotel (built in 1972 as the Hotel Stadt Schwerin) and residential buildings, four of which were designed by Georg Adolph Demmler in 1847 and built with a uniform facade.

History

Schwerin had its first rail connection in 1847 with the opening of the railway to Hagenow. This was the first railway in Mecklenburg, opened by the Mecklenburg Railway Company, connecting to the Mecklenburg Railway line. Lines were opened to Wismar in 1848, from Bad Kleinen to Rostock in 1850. A line to Crivitz (extended to Parchim in 1899) and to Ludwiglust opened in 1888 and a line to Rehna opened in 1898.

Between 1889 and 1890 the current station building was built in place of the original station building of 1847. This building has been preserved with its exterior largely unchanged. In the 1920s the station tunnel was built to allow safe access to the platforms.

The square in front of the station is named Grunthalplatz in memory of Marianne Grunthal, who was hanged from a lamppost by SS guards shortly before the end of World War II for welcoming the news of Hitler's death. The station was officially re-opened in December 2005, after three and a half years of modernisation.

Train services
The station is served by the following services:

Long distance

Regional

References

External links
Track plan for Schwerin Hbf from the site of Deutschen Bahn (PDF; 161,2 KB)

Railway stations in Mecklenburg-Western Pomerania
Railway stations in Germany opened in 1847
Buildings and structures completed in 1890
Buildings and structures in Schwerin